Emirates Hills is a gated community located in Dubai, United Arab Emirates. It is named after Beverly Hills.

Overview
Emirates Hills is largely home to the wealthy business community of Dubai, as it consists of the first freehold properties to be sold in the city. The project was classified as freehold and open to anyone to purchase. The majority of owners are from wealthy families in the region and it has been noted as one of the most exclusive neighborhoods in the GCC.

Although the developer, Emaar Properties, pioneered the idea of freehold property in Dubai, this was Emaar's first project where land was sold per square foot to individuals to build the house of their choice. Over time, all the plots were sold. Emirates Hills is the most expensive villa community to buy or rent a property in Dubai, buyers pay up to Dh2,604 per square foot, while renting costs Dh80 per sq ft. 

Some of the residents included the late Benazir Bhutto (although her family still lives there), the managing director of Géant Middle East, Mohammed Ayub Shaikh, Abdul Rahiman Abdul Azeez, owner of Alpha Smart Security Systems Business, and the owners of the Middle East Broadcasting Center and Habib Bank. 

Properties in Emirates Hills look out over the fairways of the Address Montgomerie, an 18-hole golf course created by architect Desmond Muirhead and golfer Colin Montgomerie. Villas overlooking the golf course sell for up to $52 million.

Emirates Hills is close to Dubai British School, Dubai International Academy, Emirates International School, Meadows and Emirates Hill Nursery, and Raffles Nursery. Vida Emirates Hills hotel is located here, close to the golf course.

Notable residents
Sunil Vaswani (billionaire owner and Chairman of the Stallion Group) 
The President of Zimbabwe, Robert Mugabe's son, Robert Mugabe Jr. 
Asif Ali Zardari, the former President of Pakistan (and the family of deceased former Prime Minister Benazir Bhutto)
The Gupta family (one of South Africa's wealthiest families known for their friendship with President Jacob Zuma)
Raghuvinder Kataria (billionaire investor and Chairman of Kataria Holdings)
Arif Naqvi (Founder and CEO of The Abraaj Group)
Ajay Sethi (Chairman of Channel 2 Group)
Nawaz Sharif (former Prime Minister of Pakistan)
The sons of Ishaq Dar (Finance Minister of Pakistan)
Madhu Koneru (Group Executive Director of Trimex)
Reeyaz Moosa (Chairman of Moosa Enterprises)
Maroun Semaan (former President of Petrofac)
Thaksin Shinawatra (former Prime Minister of Thailand)
Abdullah Shamim Rehmani (BOD member of Rehmani Group of companies of Pakistan)
Harshad Ramniklal Mehta (diamond tycoon who is the Chairman of Rosy Blue Group)
Mubashra Aslam (the daughter-in-law of Pakistani billionaire Malik Riaz)
Santhosh Joseph (CEO of Dubai Pearl)
Rizwan Sajan (founder and chairman of Danube Group)
Kabir Mulchandani (real estate tycoon and CEO of SKAI)
Farid Noureddine Bedjaoui (a businessman whose uncle Mohamed Bedjaoui was Minister of Foreign Affairs of Algeria)
Abdourahman Mohamed Boreh (one of the richest and most influential businessmen in Djibouti)
Hasan Abdullah Ismaik (Jordanian billionaire who is the former CEO of Arabtec)

See also
List of communities in Dubai

References

External links

 Official website

2003 establishments in the United Arab Emirates
Communities in Dubai
Residential communities in Dubai
Gated communities in the United Arab Emirates